Liber is a god of wine, male fertility, agriculture and freedom, in ancient Roman religion.

Liber may refer to:

 Meaning 'book', can also mean the adjective 'free'
 Freedom (disambiguation) in Latin and Romanian (libero in Italian); see also Gratis versus Libre
 The Latin root for many English words referring to freedom (see above), such as libertarianism, liberalism, liberty, Liberia ("free land"), and liberation
 Phloem, in botany, for which "liber" is another name
 In real estate, the book in which a subdivision plat is recorded
 Liber, Indiana, a small town in the United States
 , a Polish music producer and rapper
 LIBER, Ligue des Bibliothèques Européennes de Recherche / Association of European Research Libraries
 Liber, a publisher in Sweden owned by Infinitas Learning

See also 
 Liberia (disambiguation)